State of Affairs is the twentieth studio album by the band Kool & the Gang, released in 1996 following a four-year gap between albums.

Track listing

Personnel
James "J.T." Taylor - Vocals, drum programming, programming, sequencing
Khalis Bayyan - Alto and tenor sax, drum programming, programming, sequencing
George "Funky" Brown - Drums, drum programming, programming, sequencing
Curtis "Fitz" Williams - Keyboards, Moog synthesizer, organ
Dennis "D.T." Thomas - Alto sax
Clifford Adams - Trombone
Amir-Salaam Bayyan - Guitar
Jeff Catania - Guitar
Shawn McQuiller - Guitar
Kirk Lyons - Bass
Robert Meeks - Keyboards
Paul Sinclair - Piano
Rasheed Bell - Background vocals
Paul Kayk - Drum programming

Production
Rashad Muhammad - Editing, programming
Warren Riker - Engineer
Kendal Stubbs - Engineer
Jeff Toone - Engineer
Vittorio Zammarano - Engineer
Wade Thoren - Assistant Engineer
Ben Arrindell - Mixing
Stephan Galfas - Mixing
Andy Jackson - Mixing
James "J.T." Taylor - Producer
Khalis Bayyan - Producer

References

Kool & the Gang albums
1996 albums